George Bruce Tozer (27 June 1926 – 15 December 2021) was an Australian cricketer. He played one first-class cricket match for Victoria in 1959. Tozer died in Queensland on 15 December 2021, at the age of 95.

See also
 List of Victoria first-class cricketers

References

External links
 

1926 births
2021 deaths
Australian cricketers
Victoria cricketers